Briones Reservoir is an open cut terminal water storage reservoir located in western Contra Costa County, in the East Bay region of the San Francisco Bay Area, California.

It is owned and operated by the East Bay Municipal Utility District (EBMUD).

Geography
The reservoir is in the Briones Hills, on the west side of Briones Regional Park and northeast of Orinda. It is impounded by Briones Dam, an earthen dam completed in 1964.

Water Source
The Briones Reservoir has two sources for its water, one local and one imported.

Its watershed of 22 km² includes the Bear Creek drainage. Bear Creek formerly flowed down the valley, which the reservoir partially submerges, and still enters from the eastern section.

The major water source into the Briones Reservoir is imported from the Briones Diversion Works near Orinda. It is delivered through the Briones Aqueduct,  a 7-foot, 6-inch steel pipe, operated by four pumps that can deliver up to 60 million gallons a day. This is water imported from EDMUD’s biggest water source, the Mokelumne River in the San Joaquin Valley.

Water then leaves Briones Reservoir and flows to the lower part of the valley and into San Pablo Reservoir. From there, the water is distributed by a pumping plant in Kensington.

Recreation
Because the water in the reservoir is mainly for human potable water uses, EBMUD is very strict about recreational activities. Fishing, swimming, and wading are not allowed. However, college rowing teams from Mills College, UC Berkeley and Saint Mary's College have permission to use the lake under certain rules, such as the inspection of all boats before use on the lake in order to prevent contamination.

Two trails, the Bear Creek Trail and the Oursan Trail, together form a 14-mile (23 km) hiking trail loop that circumnavigates the reservoir. The trailhead is at the Bear Creek Staging Area, which is within Briones Regional Park. A Trail Use Permit issued by EBMUD is required for all hikers, which can be obtained online at the EBMUD website for $10. No mountain biking is permitted on the trail. Horseback riding is allowed. Dogs are allowed on the Oursan Trail segment only, and must be leashed.

Photos

See also

List of dams and reservoirs in California
List of lakes in the San Francisco Bay Area

References

External links
EBMUD—East Bay Municipal Utility District website
 
EBMUD Trail Use Permit — online purchasing website
The Brionean website

East Bay Municipal Utility District
Reservoirs in Contra Costa County, California
Dams in California
United States local public utility dams
Dams completed in 1964
Reservoirs in Northern California
1964 establishments in California